Walter Brugmann (2 April 1887 – 26 May 1944) was a Nazi German architect. From 1928 he was head of the city engineering office in Leipzig. From 1933, he was a city planner in Nuremberg, and in 1940 worked as general supervisor for Berlin. From 1942 he worked as head of the Organisation Todt in southern Russia. A member of the Nazi Party (NSDAP),  he died in an unexplained plane crash, 1944.

Brugmann led the Nuremberg Office of Structural Engineering of the massive Party Rally Grounds project devised by Adolf Hitler, consisting of marching field for military exercises, stadium, arena, congress hall, and zeppelin field. Brugmann handled stone supplies delivered by concentration camp prisoners. The project took off in 1940, when the slave labor brought in from across Europe delivered 19,075 cubic meters of quality stone to Nuremberg Party Rally Grounds for Brugmann construction. Work came to a complete stop in 1943 due to looming German defeat at the front.

See also
List of Nazi Party members

References

 This article may be expanded from the corresponding article in the German Wikipedia.

1887 births
1944 deaths
Architects from Leipzig
People from the Kingdom of Saxony
20th-century German architects
Nazi Party members
Recipients of the Knights Cross of the War Merit Cross
German civilians killed in World War II